The following is a list of notable deaths in August 2012.

Entries for each day are listed alphabetically by surname. A typical entry lists information in the following sequence:
Name, age, country of citizenship and reason for notability, established cause of death, reference (and language of reference, if not English).

August 2012

1
Ülkü Adatepe, 79, Turkish adoptee, adopted daughter of Mustafa Kemal Atatürk, road accident.
Archie Baxter, 90, Australian footballer.
Joan Bernard, 94, British academic, first Principal of Trevelyan College, Durham.
Dorothy D'Anna, 94, American actress.
Sami Damian, 82, Romanian-born Jewish literary critic and essayist.
Don Erickson, 80, American baseball player (Philadelphia Phillies).
David Eyton-Jones, 88, British Army officer.
Liselotte Funcke, 94, German politician.
Aldo Maldera, 58, Italian footballer (AC Milan).
Riccardo Ruotolo, 83, Italian Roman Catholic prelate, Auxiliary Bishop of Manfredonia-Vieste-San Giovanni Rotondo (1995–2004).
Abel Salinas, 82, Peruvian politician.
Douglas Townsend, 90, American composer and musicologist.
Barry Trapnell, 88, English cricketer and headmaster.
Keiko Tsushima, 86, Japanese actress (Seven Samurai), stomach cancer. (Japanese)
Gustavo Vassallo, 92, Argentine fencer.

2
Thor Axelsson, 91, Finnish sprint canoer.
Alistair Bell, 82, British judge and politician.
Jacques Caufrier, 70, Belgian Olympic water polo player (1960 and 1964).
Ruy de Freitas, 95, Brazilian Olympic bronze medal-winning (1948) basketball player, multiple organ failure.
Felix De Smedt, 88, Belgian pioneer judo teacher.
Amos Hakham, 91, Israeli Bible scholar, first winner of the International Bible Contest (1958).
Sir Gabriel Horn, 85, British biologist.
Magnus Isacsson, 64, Canadian documentary filmmaker (Maxime, McDuff & McDo), cancer.
Jimmy Jones, 82, American pop singer ("Handy Man", "Good Timin'").
Sir John Keegan, 78, British military historian and journalist.
Giovanni Lucchi, 69, Italian bow maker.
Jacques Marty, 72, French Olympic boxer.
Bernd Meier, 40, German footballer, heart attack.
Jean Merrill, 89, American children's author (The Pushcart War), cancer.
Marguerite Piazza, 90, American singer, heart failure.
Cesare Pinarello, 79, Italian Olympic dual bronze medallist racing cyclist (1952, 1956).
Gilbert Prouteau, 95, French poet and film director. (French)
William Smith, 4th Viscount Hambleden, 82, British peer, cancer.
Jacques-Raymond Tremblay, 88, Canadian politician.
Mihaela Ursuleasa, 33, Romanian pianist, cerebral hemorrhage.
Herman van Ham, 81, Dutch head chef.

3
Marc Alfos, 56, French voice actor.
Jan Muhammad Baloch, 60, Pakistani Olympic boxer.
John Berry, 67, English speedway promoter (Ipswich Witches) and national team manager.
Garth Burkett, 85, Australian football player.
Fernando Cavaleiro, 95, Portuguese Olympic equestrian.
Chang Do-yong, 89, South Korean general, politician and professor, dementia.
Al Conway, 82, American football player and official.
Frank Evans, 90, American Negro league baseball player.
Martin Fleischmann, 85, Czech-born British chemist, complications of Parkinson's disease.
Giorgi Gomiashvili, 39, Georgian business executive and diplomat, suicide by gunshot.
Paul McCracken, 96, American economist, Chairman of the Council of Economic Advisers (1969–1971).
John Pritchard, 85, American basketball player.

4
István Andrássy, 85, Hungarian nematologist.
Johnnie Bassett, 76, American blues musician, cancer.
Josy Braun, 74, Luxembourgish writer, journalist and translator.
Abdul Matin Chowdhury, 78, Bangladeshi politician, old age complications.
Giuseppe Coco, 76, Italian comics artist and illustrator.
Brian Crozier, 94, British author and journalist.
Metin Erksan, 83, Turkish film director, renal failure.
Hanley Funderburk, 81, American academic administrator, President of Auburn University (1980–1983).
Con Houlihan, 86, Irish sports journalist.
John J. Phelan, Jr., 81, American financier and chief executive (New York Stock Exchange).
Bud Riley, 86, American CFL coach (Winnipeg Blue Bombers, Hamilton Tiger-cats).
Arnie Risen, 87, American Hall of Fame basketball player (Boston Celtics, Rochester Royals), complications from chronic obstructive pulmonary disease (COPD) and lung cancer.
Henry Scholberg, 91, American bibliographer.
Jimmy Thomson, 75, Scottish footballer (Dunfermline Athletic).

5
Erwin Axer, 95, Polish theatre director.
Michel Daerden, 62, Belgian politician, heart attack.
Benjamin W. Heineman, 98, American railroad executive.
Fred Matua, 28, American football player, heart failure.
Martin E. Segal, 96, Russian-born American entrepreneur (Film Society of Lincoln Center).
Sister Boom Boom, 57, American gay rights activist, member of the Sisters of Perpetual Indulgence, liver cancer.
Kirk Urso, 22, American soccer player, heart failure.
Chavela Vargas, 93, Costa Rican-born Mexican singer-songwriter, respiratory arrest.
Roland Charles Wagner, 51, French author, traffic collision. (French)
Péter Zwack, 85, Hungarian businessman, philanthropist, diplomat and U.S. ambassador.
Manie van Zyl, 83, South African Olympic wrestler.

6
Míne Bean Uí Chribín, 84, Irish conservative campaigner.
Celso Blues Boy, 56, Brazilian singer and guitarist, laryngeal cancer.
Valentin Chernykh, 77, Russian screenwriter.
Douglas Alan Clark, 95, American pilot.
Richard Cragun, 67, American ballet dancer, heart attack.
Marvin Hamlisch, 68, American composer and arranger (The Way We Were, A Chorus Line, The Sting), EGOT winner, lung failure.
Robert Hughes, 74, Australian art critic and writer (The Fatal Shore).
Gerry Kearby, 65, American businessman, traffic collision.
Sir Bernard Lovell, 98, British astronomer.
Mark O'Donnell, 58, American playwright (Hairspray, Cry-Baby) and author, respiratory arrest.
Boris Razinsky, 79, Russian football player.
Ruggiero Ricci, 94, American violinist, heart failure.
Dan Roundfield, 59, American basketball player (Atlanta Hawks), drowning.
Shunpei Ueyama, 91, Japanese philosopher.
Godfried van den Boer, 78, Belgian footballer.
Eleftherios Veryvakis, 77, Greek politician.
Gregor W. Yeates, 68, New Zealand soil zoologist and ecologist.

7
Murtuz Alasgarov, 83, Azerbaijani politician, Speaker of the National Assembly (1996–2005).
Fritzi Jane Courtney, 89, American actress.
George Crawford, 86, Australian politician, member of the Victorian Legislative Council for Jika Jika (1985–1992).
Judith Crist, 90, American film critic.
Luc de Heusch, 85, Belgian filmmaker and academic.
Sabahattin Kalender, 93, Turkish composer.
Vladimir Kobzev, 52, Russian football player and coach, stroke.
Donald C. Paup, 73, American badminton player and academic.
Anna Piaggi, 81, Italian fashion writer.
Ranking Trevor, 60, Jamaican reggae musician, traffic collision.
Veljko Rogošić, 71, Croatian Olympic long-distance swimmer.
Hans Hammond Rossbach, 80, Norwegian politician.
Samala Sadasiva, 84, Indian writer.
Sir John Joseph Swaine, 80, Hong Kong politician and barrister, President of the Legislative Council (1993–1995).
Marvin Lee Wilson, 54, American convicted murderer, execution by lethal injection.
Mayer Zald, 81, American sociologist.
Dušan Zbavitel, 87, Czech Indologist.

8
Fay Ajzenberg-Selove, 86, German-born American physicist.
Japie Basson, 94,  South African politician.
Hans Camenzind, 78, Swiss electronics engineer.
Aung Shwe Prue Chowdhury, 98, Bangladeshi politician.
Lou Costello, 76, English footballer.
András Domahidy, 92, Hungarian-Australian novelist and librarian.
Ruth Etchells, 81, English poet and college principal.
Sancho Gracia, 75, Spanish actor, lung cancer. (Spanish)
Azizul Haque, 93, Bangladeshi Islamic scholar and politician.
Georgios Katsifaras, 77, Greek politician.
Surya Lesmana, 68, Indonesian football player and manager, heart attack.
Kurt Maetzig, 101, German film director. (German)

9
José Aruego, 80, Filipino children's book author and illustrator.
Harry G. Barnes, Jr., 86, American diplomat.
Ralph W. Beiting, 88, American priest.
Max Bound, 87, Australian environmental activist and trade unionist.
Gerard Campbell, 92, American Jesuit and academic, President of Georgetown University (1964–1968).
Carnegie, 21, British-bred French-trained Thoroughbred racehorse, winner of the Prix de l'Arc de Triomphe (1994), euthanized. (death announced on this date)
Ananda Dassanayake, 92, Sri Lankan politician.
Carl Davis, 77, American record producer ("Duke of Earl", "(Your Love Keeps Lifting Me) Higher and Higher"), lung disease.
Tom Dockrell, 88, American ice hockey player and coach.
Pyotr Fomenko, 80, Soviet and Russian film and theater director, teacher, and artistic director.
Gene F. Franklin, 85, American control theorist, professor emeritus of electrical engineering (Stanford University).
Al Freeman, Jr., 78, American actor (Malcolm X, My Sweet Charlie, One Life to Live) and professor.
Dale Olson, 78, American publicist, cancer.
David Rakoff, 47, Canadian-born American writer and actor (Capote, Strangers with Candy), cancer.
Hjalte Rasmussen, 71, Danish academic.
Carmen Belen Richardson, 81, Puerto Rican actress and comedian.
Jan Sawka, 65, Polish-born American artist and architect, heart attack.
Mel Stuart, 83, American film director (If It's Tuesday, This Must Be Belgium; Willy Wonka & the Chocolate Factory), cancer.
Erol Togay, 62, Turkish footballer.

10
James Lloyd Abbot, Jr., 94, American U.S. Navy rear admiral.
Umar Sulaiman Al-Ashqar, 72, Jordanian academic.
Altay Sarsenuly Amanzholov, 78, Kazakh Turkologist.
Art Andrew, 81, United States Virgin Islands Olympic sailor.
William G. Bade, 88, American mathematician.
Robert C. Becklin, 86, American businessman and politician.
Billy Bootle, 86, English footballer.
Philippe Bugalski, 49, French rally driver, injuries from fall.
Suresh Dalal, 79, Indian poet and writer in Gujarati language, heart attack.
Ioan Dicezare, 95, Romanian WWII fighter pilot ace. (Romanian)
Joe Douse, 82, American Negro League baseball player.
Irving Fein, 101, American film and television producer, manager of Jack Benny and George Burns.
Madeleine Leininger, 87, American nursing theorist.
William W. Momyer, 95, American air force general, heart ailment.
Carlo Rambaldi, 86, Italian special effects artist (Alien, Close Encounters of the Third Kind, E.T. the Extra-Terrestrial), Oscar winner (1976, 1980, 1983).

11
Red Bastien, 81, American professional wrestler, Alzheimer's disease.
Carlo Curley, 59, American classical organist.
Michael Dokes, 54, American former WBA heavyweight champion boxer, liver cancer.
Marco Antonio Dorantes García, 76, Mexican football referee.
Beverly Milton Dyck, 78, Canadian politician, progressive supranuclear palsy.
Hans Einstein, 89, American physician.
Karl Fleming, 84, American journalist, respiratory complications.
Von Freeman, 88, American hard bop jazz tenor saxophonist, heart failure.
Lucy Gallardo, 82, Argentine-born Mexican film and telenovela actress (How the Garcia Girls Spent Their Summer), chronic obstructive pulmonary disease.
Hilary Gardner, 90, South African cricketer.
Heidi Holland, 64, Zimbabwean journalist and author, apparent suicide by hanging.
Shafaat Jamil, 72, Bangladesh Army officer.
Bhadriraju Krishnamurti, 84, Indian linguist.
R. Duncan Luce, 87, American cognitive scientist.
Henning Moritzen, 84, Danish actor, heart attack. (Danish)
Dame Simone Prendergast, 82, British public servant and philanthropist.
Bill Rafferty, 68, American comedian and television host (Blockbusters, Card Sharks, Real People), heart failure.
Stuart Randall, Baron Randall of St Budeaux, 74, British politician, MP for Kingston upon Hull West (1983–1997).
Roger Sandall, 79, New Zealand anthropologist and writer.
Sid Waddell, 72, British darts commentator and author, bowel cancer.
Susan Weiner, 66, American politician, Mayor of Savannah (1992–1996), complications from surgery.

12
Eileen Beasley, 91, Welsh teacher and Welsh language campaigner, pancreatic cancer.
Ève Cournoyer, 43, Canadian singer-songwriter.
Prabuddha Dasgupta, 55, Indian fashion photographer, heart attack.
Alex Falconer, 72, Scottish politician, MEP for Mid Scotland and Fife (1984–1999).
Pedro Gasset, 88, Spanish Olympic field hockey player.
Jerry Grant, 77, American race car driver, liver failure and diabetes.
Dominic Hibberd, 71, English biographer, pneumonia-induced corticobasal degeneration.
Barbara Kimenye, 82, British-born Ugandan children's author.
Joe Kubert, 85, Polish-born American comic book artist (Sgt. Rock, Hawkman), multiple myeloma.
Jakov Labura, 74, Croatian Olympic rower.
Frank Martin, 73, American defense attorney and politician, Mayor of Columbus, Georgia (1991–1994), pancreatic cancer.
Robert W. McNitt, 97, American U.S. Navy rear admiral, dean of admissions at the U.S. Naval Academy, heart failure.
Édgar Morales Pérez, Mexican politician, mayor-elect of Matehuala, shooting.
Alf Morris, Baron Morris, 84, British politician and disability rights campaigner, MP for Manchester Wythenshawe (1964–1997).
Jackie Watters, 92, Scottish footballer (Celtic).

13
Hugo Bedau, 85, American philosopher, complications from Parkinson's disease.
Beverly Bender, 94, American sculptor.
Helen Gurley Brown, 90, American author, publisher, and businesswoman; editor-in-chief of Cosmopolitan magazine (1965–1997).
Robert Bruce, 96, Scottish composer.
Jimmy Carr, 79, American football player (Philadelphia Eagles).
Dan Daniels, 90, American sportscaster.
Salvador Escudero, 69, Filipino politician, cancer.
E. X. Giroux, 88, U.S.-born Canadian writer.
Kathi Goertzen, 54, American journalist and television anchor (KOMO-TV), benign brain tumors.
Nellie Gray, 88, American anti-abortion activist and lawyer, natural causes. (body discovered on this date)
Ray Jordon, 75, Australian cricketer and football coach, cancer.
Deborah Scaling Kiley, 54, American shipwreck survivor, sailor, author, motivational speaker and businesswoman.
Hervé-Maria Le Cléac'h, 97, French Roman Catholic prelate, Bishop of Taiohae o Tefenuaenata (1973–1986).
W. Michael Mathes, 76, American historian, expert on the history of Baja California.
Johnny Munkhammar, 37, Swedish politician, MP (2010–2012) and writer, adenoid cystic carcinoma.
Johnny Pesky, 92, American baseball player, manager, and coach (Boston Red Sox).
Joan Roberts, 95, American musical theatre actress (Oklahoma!), heart failure.
Typhoon Tracy, 6, Australian Thoroughbred racehorse, winner of the Coolmore Classic (2009) and Futurity Stakes (2010).

14
Maja Bošković-Stulli, 89,  Croatian historian, writer, publisher and academic. (Croatian)
Remy Charlip, 83, American dancer.
Colorspin, 29, French-bred, British-trained Thoroughbred racehorse and broodmare, suspected heart attack.
Vilasrao Deshmukh, 67, Indian politician, kidney and liver failure.
Svetozar Gligorić, 89, Serbian chess grandmaster, stroke.
Brian Green, 77, British football coach and player.
Svein Hansen, 69, Norwegian ice hockey player.
Sergey Kapitsa, 84, Russian physicist, demographer, and television host; son of Pyotr Kapitsa.
Billy Kerr, 67, Irish Olympic cyclist.
Marilyn Leavitt-Imblum, 66, American embroidery designer.
Charles Maynard, 42, Bahamian politician, chairman of the opposition Free National Movement (since 2012), apparent heart attack.
Anna Orso, 73, Italian actress.
Ron Palillo, 63, American actor (Welcome Back, Kotter), heart attack.
Al Rabin, 76, American producer and director (Days of Our Lives).
Rosemary Rice, 87, American radio and television actress (Archie Andrews, Mama).
Smoke, American donkey, therapy animal for the United States Marine Corps.
Phyllis Thaxter, 92, American actress (Superman, Thirty Seconds Over Tokyo), Alzheimer's disease.
*Zhou Kehua, 42, Chinese criminal, shooting.

15
Elson Iazegi Beyruth, 70, Brazilian footballer, complications of diabetes.
Bob Birch, 56, American musician (Elton John), apparent suicide by gunshot.
Jeffery Boswall, 81, British naturalist and broadcaster, cancer.
Richard B. Brewer, 61, American chief executive officer (Myrexis), cancer.
Altamiro Carrilho, 87, Brazilian musician and composer, lung cancer.
Enzo Cavazzoni, 80, Italian Olympic water polo player.
Biff Elliot, 89, American actor (Alfred Hitchcock Presents, I, the Jury, The Enemy Below).
Joaquín Filba, 89, Spanish cyclist.
Punch Gunalan, 68, Malaysian badminton player, liver cancer.
Harry Harrison, 87, American science fiction writer (Make Room! Make Room!, The Stainless Steel Rat).
Henry Herx, 79, American film critic, complications from liver cancer.
Ralph Holman, 94, American biochemist.
Matthew Ianniello, 92, American mobster, member of the Genovese crime family.
Elisabeth von Janota-Bzowski, 99, German graphic artist and postage stamp designer.
Müşfik Kenter, 79, Turkish theater actor, lung cancer.
Colleen B. Lemmon, 85, American Latter Day Saint counselor.
Ashok Mehta, 65, Indian cinematographer (Bandit Queen), lung cancer.
Carina Moberg, 46, Swedish politician, MP for Stockholm County (1994–2012), cancer.
Albert (Peto) Nicholas, 61, Cook Islands politician, heart attack.
Burl Osborne, 75, American publisher, chairman of the Associated Press (2002–2007), after short illness.
Mitchell Todd, 21, British rugby player (Nottingham), traffic collision.
Sir Ray Whitney, 81, British politician, MP for Wycombe (1978–2001).
Heinz Wittig, 74, German Olympic water polo player.
Arbën Xhaferi, 64, Macedonian politician and Albanian-rights activist, complications from a stroke.

16
Peter Joseph Bis, 60–61, American homeless man, heart attack.
Larry R. Brown, 69, American politician, member of the North Carolina House of Representatives (since 2005), heart attack.
Candice Cohen-Ahnine, 34–35, French-born former Saudi royal, fall from apartment window.
T. G. Kamala Devi, 81, Indian actor and playback singer.
Evon Dickson, 77, New Zealand cricketer.
Akiva Ehrenfeld, 90, Austrian-born Israeli Orthodox Jewish rabbi.
Martine Franck, 74, Belgian photographer, bone marrow cancer.
Owsley Brown Frazier, 77, American philanthropist.
*Jang Hyun-kyu, 30, South Korean footballer, suspected heart attack.
Phil Kelly, 73, Irish footballer.
William Kent, 93, American artist.
Constance Kgosiemang, 66, Namibian politician, paramount chief of the Tswana people, heart attack.
Lalla Amina of Morocco, 58, Moroccan royal, daughter of Mohammed V of Morocco, lung cancer.
Marvin Meyer, 64, American biblical scholar, cancer.
Abune Paulos, 76, Ethiopian patriarch of the Ethiopian Orthodox Tewahedo Church, heart attack.
Bystrík Režucha, 77, Slovak conductor.
William Windom, 88, American actor (Murder She Wrote, To Kill a Mockingbird, Star Trek), heart failure.
Katsumi Yamauchi, 100, Japanese politician, mayor of Iwata, Shizuoka, natural causes.

17
Joan Bielski, 88, Australian activist.
Aase Bjerkholt, 97, Norwegian politician and government minister, Minister of Family and Consumer Affairs (1956–1963, 1963–1965).
Pál Bogár, 84, Hungarian Olympic basketball player.
Amparo Cuevas, 81, Spanish Roman Catholic seer.
Axel Edelstam, 88, Swedish diplomat.
Joey Kovar, 29, American reality TV star (The Real World: Hollywood, Celebrity Rehab with Dr. Drew), opiate intoxication.
Geoffrey Lees, 92, English cricketer and educator, prolonged illness.
John Lynch-Staunton, 82, Canadian politician, Senator (1990–2005), leader of the Conservative Party (2003–2004), heart attack.
Willem G. van Maanen, 91, Dutch journalist and writer. (Dutch)
Panos Markovic, 87, Greek football coach and player.
Lou Martin, 63, Northern Irish musician (Rory Gallagher).
Brian Oakley, 84, British civil servant and scientist.
Shirley W. Palmer-Ball, 82, American businessman and politician.
Veronique Peck, 80, French-born American arts patron, widow of Gregory Peck.
Victor Poor, 79, American engineer, co-developer of the microchip and various radio developments, cancer.
Patrick Ricard, 67, French entrepreneur (Pernod Ricard), complications from a heart attack.

18
Samuel Anderson, 82, Cuban Olympic hurdler.
Hisham al-Hayali, Iraqi politician, Governor of Diyala Governorate (2012), traffic collision.
Tayseer al-Mashhadani, Iraqi engineer and politician, traffic collision.
Alan Bateman, 76, Australian film producer and television screenwriter, cancer.
Harrison Begay, 94, American painter.
George Bowers, 68, American film editor (A League of Their Own, The Country Bears, Harlem Nights), complications following heart surgery.
Lourival Mendes França, Brazilian draughts player.
Robert B. Gaither, 83, American mechanical engineer.
Les Kaine, 76, Australian footballer (Hawthorn).
John Kovatch, 92, American football player (Washington Redskins).
Scott McKenzie, 73, American singer ("San Francisco (Be Sure to Wear Flowers in Your Hair)") and songwriter ("Kokomo"), Guillain–Barré syndrome.
Ra. Ki. Rangarajan, 85, Indian Tamil language writer.
Jesse Robredo, 54, Filipino politician, Mayor of Naga City (1988–1998, 2001–2010), Secretary of the Interior and Local Government (since 2010), plane crash.
Eilif Straume, 83, Norwegian writer and critic.

19
Ghazi al-Sadiq, Sudanese politician, Minister of Guidance and Religious Endowments, plane crash.
Yuriy Avanesov, 77, Soviet football player and coach.
Doug Dench, 82, Australian football player.
Hellmut Geissner, 86, German scholar.
Donal Henahan, 91, American music critic.
Ivar Iversen, 97, Norwegian Olympic sprint canoeist.
Laura Latini, 42, Italian voice actress, cancer.
Maïté Nahyr, 64, South African-born Belgian actress.
Samia Yusuf Omar, 21, Somali Olympic runner, drowning. (death announced on this date)
Tony Scott, 68, British film director (Top Gun, True Romance, Man on Fire) and producer, suicide by jumping.
Edmund Skellings, 80, American poet.

20
Agnes World, 17, American-bred, Japanese-trained Thoroughbred racehorse and sire.
Seweryn Chajtman, 93, Polish scientist.
Phyllis Diller, 95, American comedian and actress (The Pruitts of Southampton), natural causes.
Virginia Dwyer, 92, American actress (Another World, As the World Turns, Guiding Light).
Juan Edmunds Rapahango, 89, Chilean Rapa Nui politician.
Daryl Hine, 76, American poet, editor, and translator, intestinal blockage.
Jacob Matijevic, 64, American engineer (NASA).
Dom Mintoff, 96, Maltese politician, Prime Minister (1955–1958, 1971–1984), natural causes.
Len Quested, 87, English footballer.
Kapu Rajaiah, 87, Indian painter, complication of Parkinson's disease.
Alexander Saxton, 93, American novelist and historian.
Mika Yamamoto, 45, Japanese journalist, shooting.
Meles Zenawi, 57, Ethiopian politician, President (1991–1995), Prime Minister (since 1995), liver cancer.

21
Vinus van Baalen, 70, Dutch Olympic swimmer.
Paul Bassim, 89, Lebanese Roman Catholic prelate, Vicar Apostolic of Beirut (1974–1999).
Joe Cunningham, 80–81, Northern Irish Gaelic footballer.
Tissa David, 91, Hungarian-born American animator (Raggedy Ann & Andy: A Musical Adventure), cancer.
John Davidson, 87, American politician, member of the Illinois Senate (1973–1993), natural causes.
Hans Josephsohn, 92, Swiss sculptor.
Delcia Kite, 88, Australian politician, member of the New South Wales Legislative Council (1976–1995).
Kyle Larsen, 62, American contract bridge player.
Georg Leber, 91, German politician, Minister of Defence (1972–1978).
Gary Mara, 50, Australian rugby league player (Balmain Tigers), traffic collision.
Taketoshi Naito, 86, Japanese actor.
Don Raleigh, 86, Canadian ice hockey player (New York Rangers), complications of a fall.
J. Frank Raley, 85, American politician, member of the Maryland Senate (1963–1966), heart attack.
Roy Speer, 80, American businessman (Home Shopping Network).
Guy Spitaels, 80, Belgian politician, Leader of the Socialist Party (1981–1992), Minister-President of Wallonia (1992–1994), brain tumor.
William Thurston, 65, American mathematician, melanoma.
Sergio Toppi, 79, Italian cartoonist, cancer.
Ivan the Gorilla, 48–50, gorilla who didn't see his kind for 27 years, chest tumor.

22
Houcine Anafal, 59, Moroccan footballer, heart attack.
Bernie Anderson, 71, Australian footballer.
Nina Bawden, 87, British author (Carrie's War).
Larry Carp, 86, American attorney and diplomat.
David K. Cheng, 94, Chinese-born American professor.
Charles Flores, 41, Cuban-born American jazz bassist, throat cancer.
José Foralosso, 74, Italian-born Brazilian Roman Catholic prelate, Bishop of Marabá (2000–2012), complications from a stroke. 
Trevor French, Australian Paralympic swimmer.
Guy Landry Hazoumé, 72, Beninese politician and poet.
Paulino Matip Nhial, South Sudanese military leader and politician, complications of diabetes.
Paul Shan Kuo-hsi, 88, Taiwanese Roman Catholic cardinal, Bishop of Kaohsiung (1991–2006), pneumonia.
Martin Shikuku, 79, Kenyan politician, MP for Butere (1963–1975, 1979–1988, 1992–1997), cancer.
Jeffrey Stone, 85, American actor, model for Prince Charming in Cinderella.
András Szennay, 91, Hungarian Roman Catholic prelate, Abbot of the Pannonhalma Archabbey (1973–1991).

23
Col Campbell, 78, Australian gardener, cancer.
* Paul Ch'eng Shih-kuang, 96, Taiwanese Roman Catholic prelate, Bishop of Tainan (1966–1990).
Jean-Luc Delarue, 48, French television producer and host, stomach cancer.
Aubrey Dunn, Sr., 84, American politician, member of the New Mexico Senate (1965–1980), cancer.
James Fogle, 75, American author (Drugstore Cowboy), mesothelioma.
Byard Lancaster, 70, American jazz multi-instrumentalist, pancreatic cancer.
Howard Lee, 77, Bermudian Olympic sailor.
Edith Mastenbroek, 37, Dutch politician, Member of the European Parliament (2004–2008), cardiac arrest.
Bob Myrick, 59, American baseball player (New York Mets), heart attack.
Merv Neagle, 54, Australian AFL football player (Essendon), traffic collision.
Jerry Nelson, 78, American puppeteer (The Muppet Show, Sesame Street, Fraggle Rock), prostate cancer and COPD.
James Serrin, 85, American mathematician.
Josepha Sherman, 65, American science fiction author.
Steve Van Buren, 91, American Hall of Fame football player (Philadelphia Eagles), pneumonia.

24
Henry H. Black, 83, American marine.
Werner Braun, 86, German musicologist.
Cornelia Brierly, 99, American architect.
Bud Chamberlain, 92, American baseball player and realtor.
Dadullah, Pakistani Taliban leader (Bajaur Agency), airstrike.
Aleksander Donner, 65, Ukrainian handball coach.
Lijon Eknilang, 66, Marshallese anti–nuclear weapons activist. (death reported on this date)
Pauli Ellefsen, 76, Faroese politician, Prime Minister (1981–1985). (Faroese)
Sir Richard Evans, 84, British diplomat, Ambassador to the People's Republic of China (1984–1988).
*Félix Miélli Venerando, 74, Brazilian footballer, 1970 FIFA World Cup winner, cardiac arrest.
Steve Franken, 80, American actor (Bewitched, The Many Loves of Dobie Gillis), cancer.
Bud Goodall, 59, American scholar and writer, pancreatic cancer.
Gerd Greune, 63, German politician.
Zygmunt Kiszkurno, 91, Polish Olympic sport shooter. 
Claire Malis, 69, American actress (One Life to Live, From Here to Eternity, The Facts of Life), heart failure and pneumonia.
Dale Sommers, 68, American radio personality, Addison's disease.
Maureen Toal, 82, Irish actress.
Krum Yanev, 83, Bulgarian Olympic footballer.

25
Florencio Amarilla, 77, Paraguayan footballer, coach and actor.
Neil Armstrong, 82, American astronaut, first person to walk on the Moon, complications from surgery.
R. Palmer Beasley, 76, American physician, public health educator, and epidemiologist, pancreatic cancer.
Ray Booty, 79, English cyclist, British Empire and Commonwealth Games gold medallist (1958), cancer.
Stephen Bradford, 48, English cricket player (Lincolnshire).
Willard C. Butcher, 85, American banker, cancer.
Joshua Casteel, 32, American soldier and playwright, lung cancer.
Stanley Crooks, 70, American tribal leader, Chairman of the Shakopee Mdewakanton Sioux Community (1992–2012), respiratory ailment.
Wisse Dekker, 88, Dutch businessman, traffic collision.
Georg Feuerstein, 65, German-born Canadian scholar of Hinduism.
Roger Fisher, 90, American academic.
Vesna Girardi-Jurkić, 68, Croatian archeologist and museologist.
* Roberto González Barrera, 82, Mexican businessman, founder of Gruma, cancer.
Donald Gorrie, 79, Scottish politician, MSP for Central Scotland (1999–2007), MP for Edinburgh West (1997–2001).
* Aurélio Granada Escudeiro, 92, Portuguese Roman Catholic prelate, Bishop of Angra (1979–1996), pneumonia.
Angkarn Kalayanapong, 86, Thai poet and artist, heart disease and diabetes.
Eduardo Koaik, 86, Brazilian Roman Catholic prelate, Bishop of Piracicaba (1984–2002), cancer. (Portuguese)
V. K. Lakshmanan, 80, Indian politician, MP for Coimbatore East (1991–2006).
Richard Norris, 80, British Olympic bronze medallist field hockey player (1952).
Emilio Pacione, 92, Scottish footballer (Dundee United).
Manola Saavedra, 76, Spanish-born Mexican actress.
Pontus Schultz, 40, Swedish journalist, ravine fall during 2012 Haute Route bicycle race.
Juan Valdez, 74, American land rights activist.

26
Russ Alben, 82, American advertising executive.
Reginald Bartholomew, 76, American diplomat, cancer.
Jacques Bensimon, 69, Canadian film executive, cancer.
Gérard Bitsindou, 70, Congolese politician.
Viredo Espinosa, 83, Cuban artist, vascular disease.
Robert T. Gannett, 94, American politician and lawyer.
John Goldkamp, 64, American criminologist, multiple myeloma.
George Gunther, 92, American politician. 
A. K. Hangal, 98, Indian actor, complications from a fall.
Countess Alix de Lannoy, 70, Belgian countess, mother of Stéphanie de Lannoy, stroke.
Peter L. Shelton, 67, American architect, cancer.
Karsten Anker Solhaug, 97, Norwegian salvationist.
Alan Steen, 90, English footballer (Wolverhampton Wanderers).
Krzysztof Wilmanski, 72, Polish physicist, pancreatic cancer.

27
Neville Alexander, 75, South African revolutionary and linguist, cancer.
Aurora Bautista, 86, Spanish film actress.
Malcolm Browne, 81, American journalist and photographer (1964 Pulitzer Prize), complications of Parkinson's disease.
Irwin Cohen, 60, American judoka, amyloidosis and myelodysplastic syndromes.
Tony Dumper, 88, British Anglican prelate, Bishop of Dudley (1977–1993).
Richard L. Fisher, 64, American politician and energy executive, heart attack.
Art Heyman, 71, American basketball player (New York Knicks, Philadelphia 76ers).
Allan Horsfall, 84, British gay rights activist.
Ivica Horvat, 86, Croatian football player and manager.
Richard Keyes, 81, American painter.
Sir Richard Kingsland, 95, Australian RAAF pilot and public servant.
Geliy Korzhev, 87, Russian painter.
Karl Lennert, 91, German physician and pathologist.
Leonard Linsky, 90, American philosopher.
Louis Ncamiso Ndlovu, 67, Swazi Roman Catholic prelate, Bishop of Manzini (1985–2012), heart failure.
Antoine Redin, 77, French footballer and football manager. (French)
Aboud Rogo, 44, Kenyan Islamic cleric, shooting.
Russell Scott, 91, American clown and television host (Blinky's Fun Club), pneumonia.
Tomáš Sedláček, 94, Czech general, anti-Nazi resistance member, and political prisoner, melanoma. 
* Tao Wei, 46, Chinese football player and commentator, heart attack. (Chinese)
Roger J. White, 71, British-born American Episcopal prelate, Bishop of Milwaukee (1985–2003), brain aneurysm.
Albert George Wilson, 94, American astronomer.

28
Akhlakul Hossain Ahmed, 85, Bangladeshi physician and politician.
Said Afandi al-Chirkawi, 74, Russian Muslim Sufi leader, suicide bomb attack.
Sir Rhodes Boyson, 87, British educator, author and politician, MP for Brent North (1974–1997).
Norm Dussault, 86, American ice hockey player (Montreal Canadiens).
Maffeo Giovanni Ducoli, 93, Italian Roman Catholic prelate, Bishop of Belluno-Feltre (1975–1996).
Eva Figes, 80, English author.
Shulamith Firestone, 67, Canadian-born American feminist writer (The Dialectic of Sex).
Dave Fredrickson, 85, American archaeologist, anthropologist, and folk singer.
William Pascal Kikoti, 55, Tanzanian Roman Catholic prelate, Bishop of Mpanda (since 2000), complications of high blood pressure.
Dick McBride, 84, American beat poet.
Saul Merin, 79, Israeli ophthalmologist.
K. Pankajakshan, 84, Indian politician, MLA in Kerala (1971–1977, 1980–1991), cardiac arrest.
Alfred Schmidt, 81, German philosopher.
Ramón Sota, 74, Spanish golfer, pneumonia.

29
Said Aburish, 77, Palestinian journalist.
Margie Foote, 82, American politician.
Ruth Goldbloom, 88, Canadian philanthropist, co-founder of the Pier 21 museum, cancer.
Nicholas Goodrick-Clarke, 59, British academic and author (The Occult Roots of Nazism), cancer.
Shoshichi Kobayashi, 80, Japanese mathematician.
Anne McKnight, 88, American opera singer.
Les Moss, 87, American baseball player (St. Louis Browns).
Daniel O'Keefe, 84, American author and editor (Reader's Digest), inventor of Festivus.
Sergei Ovchinnikov, 43, Russian volleyball coach (women's national team), suspected suicide by hanging.
Jeremy Pope, 76, New Zealand activist and lawyer.
Donald Edgar Tewes, 96, American businessman and politician, Representative from Wisconsin (1957–1959).
Valyra, 3, British-bred French-trained Thoroughbred racehorse, winner of the Prix de Diane (2012), euthanized.

30
Bernardo Bonezzi, 48, Spanish film music composer.
Daire Brehan, 55, Irish broadcaster, actress and barrister, cancer.
L. Macon Epps, 92, American engineer, inventor, author and poet.
Gaeton Fonzi, 76, American investigative journalist, complications from Parkinson's disease.
Kristian Fougner, 93, Norwegian engineer and resistance member.
Paul Friedrichs, 72, German motocross racer.
Bill Kini, 75, New Zealand boxer and rugby player, cancer.
Igor Kvasha, 79, Russian actor.
Carlos Larrañaga, 75, Spanish actor, cardiac decompensation.
Chris Lighty, 44, American talent manager, co-founder of Violator Entertainment, suicide by gunshot.
Nat Peeples, 86, American professional baseball player.
Don Richard Riso, 66, American teacher and author, cancer.
Jacek Sempoliński, 85, Polish painter, art professor, critic, and essayist. 
Anton Skulberg, 90, Norwegian scientist and politician, MP for Østfold (1969–1972, 1974–1977). 
Vidar Theisen, 79, Norwegian meteorologist and weather presenter, Parkinson's disease.
Gabriel Vahanian, 85, French Christian theologian.
Christopher Williams, 85, British Olympic bobsledder.
Xin Kegui, 61, Chinese academic and civil engineer.

31
Cornelis Christiaan Berg, 78, Dutch botanist.
Max Bygraves, 89, British singer, variety performer, and TV game show host (Family Fortunes), complications from Alzheimer's disease.
Lucas Luis Dónnelly, 91, Argentine Roman Catholic prelate.
Mark J. Dworkin, 66, Canadian writer.
Rajvinder Kaur Gill, 40, Canadian banker, strangulation.
Tom Keating, 69, American football player (Oakland Raiders), prostate cancer.
Alan M. Kriegsman, 84, American dance critic (1976 Pulitzer Prize for Criticism), heart disease.
Franz Kieslich, 99, German air force officer, awarded Knight's Cross of the Iron Cross.
Kris Kin, 12, American-bred British-trained Thoroughbred racehorse, winner of The Derby (2003), cervical fracture. (death announced on this date)
Joe Lewis, 68, American martial arts master, actor, brain tumor.
Carlo Maria Martini, 85, Italian Roman Catholic prelate, Cardinal Archbishop of Milan (1979–2002), Parkinson's disease.
Frank B. McDonald, 87, American astrophysicist.
Pedro Medina Avendaño, 96, Colombian poet.
Steven Smith Mijiga, 74, Malawian civil servant, Post Master General.
A. Mathias Mundadan, 88, Indian priest.
Kashiram Rana, 74, Indian politician, MLA for Surat East (1975–1980) and MP for Surat (1989–2009), heart attack.
Heraldine Rock, 79, Saint Lucian educator and politician.
John C. Shabaz, 81, American judge and politician, member of the Wisconsin State Assembly (1964–1979).
Sergey Sokolov, 101, Soviet military commander, Marshal of the Soviet Union, Minister of Defense of the Soviet Union (1984–1987).
Theatrical, 30,  Irish-bred American Thoroughbred racehorse, winner of the Breeders' Cup Turf (1987), euthanized.
Edward Vincent, 78, American politician, first African-American Mayor of Inglewood, California (1983–1996), member of the California State Assembly (1996–2000).
Norbert Walter, 67, German economist.
Mahmoud El-Gohary, 74, Egyptian football player and coach, complications of a stroke.

References

2012-08
 08